Akash Verma (born 28 November 1990) is an Indian first-class cricketer who plays for Jharkhand. He made his first-class debut for Jharkhand in the 2010–11 Ranji Trophy on 1 December 2010.

References

External links
 

1990 births
Living people
Indian cricketers
Jharkhand cricketers